The Tewa are a linguistic group of Pueblo Native Americans who speak the Tewa language and share the Pueblo culture.  Their homelands are on or near the Rio Grande in New Mexico north of Santa Fe.  They comprise the following communities:
 Nambé Pueblo
 Pojoaque Pueblo
 San Ildefonso Pueblo
 Ohkay Owingeh 
 Santa Clara Pueblo.
 Tesuque Pueblo

The Hopi Tewa, descendants of those who fled the Second Pueblo Revolt of 1680–1692, live on the Hopi Reservation in Arizona, mostly in Tewa Village and Polacca on the First Mesa. Other Hopi clans are known to be descendants of Tewa people.

Tewa is one of five Tanoan languages spoken by the Pueblo people of New Mexico. Though these five languages are closely related, speakers of one cannot fully understand speakers of another (similar to German and Dutch speakers). The six Tewa-speaking pueblos are Nambe, Pojoaque, San Ildefonso, Ohkay Owingeh, Santa Clara, and Tesuque.

Language
As with speakers of Tiwa, Towa and Keres, there is some disagreement among the Tewa people as to whether Tewa should be a written language or not. Some Pueblo elders feel that Tewa languages should be preserved by oral traditions alone. However, many Tewa speakers have decided that Tewa literacy is important for passing the language on to the children.

The Tewa pueblos developed their own orthography (spelling system) for their language, Ohkay Owingeh has published a dictionary of Tewa, and today most of the Tewa-speaking pueblos have established Tewa-language programs to teach children to read and write in this language.

Notable people
Maria Martinez, a famous potter known for black on black ware
Popay, pueblo revolt leader
Esther Martinez, a Tewa linguist
Jody Naranjo, potter
Rose Gonzales, potter

References

Further reading
 Ortman, Scott G. (2012) Winds from the North: Tewa Origins and Historical Anthropology. .

External links

Collection of Turn of the Century Photographs of Tewa Indians
indigenouslanguage.org

 
Puebloan peoples
Native American history of Arizona
Native American history of New Mexico
Native American tribes in Arizona
Native American tribes in New Mexico
Southwest tribes